Chantal Sophia "Tessa" Dahl (born 11 April 1957) is an English author and former actress. She is the daughter of British author Roald Dahl and American actress Patricia Neal.

Early life
Dahl was born at John Radcliffe Hospital in Oxford, the second daughter of British author Roald Dahl and American actress Patricia Neal; her elder sister Olivia died from measles in 1962. She grew up in Great Missenden, Buckinghamshire, and attended Roedean and Downe House schools, the Elizabeth Russell Cookery School and the Herbert Bergof Acting Studio.

Career
Dahl has worked as an actress, modelled, worked at an antique shop, worked at an employment agency and written articles for Tatler before publishing her first novel, the semi-autobiographical Working For Love, in 1988. Dahl became an author of children's fiction. Her book Gwenda and the Animals won the Friends of the Earth Best Children's Book of the Year. In addition, she has written extensively for the London Times, Sunday Times, The Daily Telegraph, The Sunday Telegraph, the Daily Mail, The Mail on Sunday, Vogue, House and Garden (US) and YOU Magazine. For many years, she was a contributing editor to the magazine Tatler.

Personal life
Dahl's relationship with actor Julian Holloway produced one daughter, model and author Sophie Dahl; the couple separated shortly afterwards. She subsequently married businessman James Kelly and had two children, Clover and Luke. She then married businessman Patrick Donovan (deceased on 7 February 2021), son of Ambassador Francis Patrick Donovan, and had a son, Ned, a journalist. In 2019, the Jordanian royal court announced Ned's engagement to Princess Raiyah bint Hussein.

Tessa Dahl has also had relationships with Peter Sellers, David Hemmings, Bryan Ferry, Brian de Palma and Dai Llewellyn.

Filmography

Television

Theatre
Apprenticed at the Barter Theatre, Abingdon, Va. (1972). The Deep Man by Hugo von Hofmannsthal (1979) Royal Exchange, Manchester.

Bibliography
 Working for Love (1988)
 The Same But Different (1988) – picture book
 Gwenda & the Animals (1989)
 School Can Wait (1990)
 Babies, Babies, Babies (1991) – picture book
 Everywoman's Experience of Pregnancy and Birth (1994)

References

External links
 
 Tessa Dahl at Fantastic Fiction

1957 births
Living people
20th-century English novelists
English women novelists
English children's writers
English film actresses
English people of American descent
English people of Norwegian descent
English people of Welsh descent
People educated at Roedean School, East Sussex
People from Great Missenden
20th-century English women writers
Tessa
writers from Oxford